Heart Warming was a gospel record label started by  John T. Benson Jr. Heart Warming and their chief rival Canaan Records (owned by Word Records) were arguably the two biggest and best gospel labels in their time. The Oak Ridge Boys, Jd Sumner and the Stamps Quartet, Jake Hess & The Imperials, Dottie Rambo, Bill Gaither Trio and Speer Family all signed to it and had many recordings on it. The Cathedral Quartet produced two of their most popular albums on it With Brass and With Strings.

Producers for the label included Bob Benson (John Benson's son), Bob MacKenzie (died Oct. 20, 2000), and Don Light. Bob MacKenzie in particular produced some of the best gospel albums of that era and some of the best albums of the groups above.

Eventually the Benson company dropped the Heart Warming label instead having RiverSong be the southern gospel division and Impact Records and later Benson labels be their contemporary labels.

Finally in 2006 it was announced that Heart Warming, along with RiverSong was sold to Homeland Entertainment Group, former President of Zondervan Music Group, Bob Jones Jr is part owner of the company.

Artist Roster
This is an incomplete list of past and present artists that have recorded on this label
 Jake Hess & The Imperials
 Oak Ridge Boys
 JD Sumner & The Stamps Quartet
 Cathedral Quartet
 Dottie Rambo
 The Rambos
 Speer Family
 The Sego Brothers and Naomi
 Hemphills
 Bill Gaither Trio
 The Deweys
 Sharon Haygood
  Henry and Hazel Slaughter
 [Terrific Tennesseans] Golden Favorites LPHF1739
 The Kingsmen Quartet
 The Happy Goodmen Family
 Rusty Goodmen

See also
 List of record labels

References

External links
 Encyclopedia of American gospel music by W. K. McNeil: Heart Warming Records
 Homeland Entertainment Group, Official Website

American record labels
Christian record labels
Record labels established in 1962